The 2011 Summer Universiade, the XXVI Summer Universiade also Shenzhen 2011, was hosted in Shenzhen, Guangdong, China.

Bid selection

The cities of Kazan, Russia, Kaohsiung, Taiwan, Shenzhen, China, Murcia, Spain, and Poznań, Poland were in contention for the Games. On 16 January 2007, FISU announced at the conference prior to the 2007 Winter Universiade, that the host would be Shenzhen. With five candidates, it was the most competitive race to host a Universiade. Edmonton, Alberta, Canada was also posed to make a serious bid, but withdrew.

Shenzhen was not considered a favorite, as several other sporting competitions have been assigned to China in recent years, including the 2008 Summer Olympics in Beijing, the 2009 Winter Universiade in Harbin, and the 2010 Asian Games in Guangzhou. Also, as a city, Shenzhen was only 30 years old as of 2010 and lacked experience in hosting a major sporting competition, compared to the other candidates.

Preparation

In preparation for the event, Shenzhen built numerous infrastructure objects, including several new lines of Shenzhen Metro. The preparation cost was estimated to exceed 180 billion RMB, including 75 billion RMB spent on new subway lines, 12 billion RMB on facelifting buildings and streets and 4.1 billion RMB spent on the 60,000-seat stadium.

Also added were 200 of BYD's all-electric eBUS's and 300 of BYD's all-electric e6's (a 5-passenger sedan that serves well as an eTaxi), making this new-energy fleet the largest of its kind in the world.

After the conclusion of the international multi-sport events at the 2011 Universiade Games, the eBUS's and eTaxi's continued serving as public transportation for Shenzhen City.

On the down side, 80,000 residents were evicted from the city for reasons such as lack of regular employment because they were deemed a 'threat' to the Universiade. The move was highly controversial and sparked a debate on the legality of the policy.

Residents of apartment buildings close to the stadium were ordered to leave their houses for five hours but to leave the lights on. 15,000 paramilitary police from other cities were deployed in Shenzhen, in addition to Shenzhen's own 5,000-strong force.

Shenzhen Airport was ordered closed during the opening ceremony, affecting up to 290 flights.

According to the head of Shenzhen's Communist Party division, Wang Rong, all this was done to prevent embarrassment of China in front of the world, as many foreigners were to be present in the city during the Games.

Mascot
The mascot of 2011 Summer Universiade is called UU. Its design is related to the logo of the Universiade, the Happy U. It represents a smiling face, with the image of the first letter "U" in the word "Universiade". Its relationship with the logo, the "Happy U" breaks the traditional mascot design idea to be realistic, and comforts to the spirit of the Universiade.

Tickets
Delegations could obtain complimentary tickets before 23 May. As of 24 May, 80 days away from the opening ceremony, the ticket sale was not yet started. It was announced that tickets will cost between 30 and 300 RMB. In July 2011, tickets went on sale to the general public in several phases. Tickets for the opening and closing ceremonies would not be sold to the general public.

Venues

Early reports promised the city would build 12 new stadiums and gyms in the Futian, Nanshan and Luohu districts. A new International Olympic Centre featuring a 60,000-seat main stadium, a 18,000-seat gym, a 13.4-square-kilometre park and other facilities, also were established in Longgang District. By the end, 21 new venues and stadiums were successfully completed.

The 2011 Summer Universiade used 54 stadiums including 29 competition halls and 25 training halls. Avant company is the only sports seating facility supplier.

The universiade including Universiade 2011 Shenzhen Sports Center, Shenzhen Sports Center-natatorium, Shenzhen Stadium, Sports City, Shenzhen Gym, Shenzhen natatorium, Shenzhen Sports Team Training Hall, Longgang International Velodrome, Luohu Gym, Bao’an Sports Center, Nanshan Recreation and Sports Activities Center, Shenzhen University Gym, etc.

Main gymnasium of Universiade center has an area of 45,000 square meters, 4 layers, allowing more than 18,000 spectators to watch matches. Many basketball matches and championships were held here, so it satisfied all standards and specifications of FIBA. Stands were constructed around the whole basketball gymnasium.

Shenzhen Swimming and Diving Gym – Aquatics Diving 
Universiade Center Aquatic Center – Aquatics Swimming
Bao’an Natatorium – Aquatics Water polo
Seven Star Bay – Aquatics Open Water Swimming, Sailing
Shenwanyi Road Football Pitch – Archery
New Shenzhen Stadium – Athletics, Football
Roads of Longgang – Athletics
Shenzhen Institute of Information Technology gym – Badminton
Universiade sports center Basketball court – Basketball
Gymnasium of Pingshan Sports Center – Basketball
Shenzhen Luohu Gymnasium – Basketball
Gymnasium of the Senior High Division of Shenzhen Foreign Languages School – Basketball
Dameisha Park – Beach Volleyball
Shenzhen Conference and Exhibition Center – Chess, Fencing, Judo, Taekwondo
Longgang Sports Center – Cycling
Bao'an Xixiang Sports Center – Football
Shenzhen Sport School – Football, Weightlifting
Shenzhen University Town – Football
Shenzhen Bao‘an Stadium – Football
Shenzhen Institute of Information Technology – Football
Mission Hills Golf Club – Golf
Bao'an District Gym – Gymnastics
Futain Sports Park Gym – Gymnastics
Shenzhen Maritime Sports Base & Sailing School – Sailing
Shenzhen Shooting Hall and Clay-pigeon Shooting Field – Shooting
Shenzhen Bay Sport Center – Table tennis
Longgang Tennis Center – Tennis
Shenzhen Tennis Center – Tennis
Shenzhen Gym – Volleyball

Sports
Following is a list of the sports that were contested at the 2011 Summer Universiade:

 Aquatics
 
 
 
 
 
 
 
 
 
 Cycling
 BMX (2)
 Mountain biking (2)
 Road (4)
 Track (8)
 
 
 Gymnastics
 Aerobics (6)
 Artistic Gymnastics (14)
 Rhythmic Gymnastics (8)

Participants
150 countries participated in 2011 Summer Universiade. 

 
 
 
 
 
 
 
 
 
 
 
 
 
 
 
 
 
 
 
 
 
 
 
 
 
 
 
 
  (host)
 
 
 
 
 
 
 
 
 
 
 
 
 
 
 
 
 
 
 
 
 
 
 
 
 
 
 
 
 
 
 
 
 
 
 
 
 
 
 
 
 
 
 
 
 
 
 
 
 
 
 
 
 
 
 
 
 
 
 
 
 
 
 
 
 
 
 
 
 
 
 
 
 
 
 
 
 
 
 
 
 
 
 
 
  (4)

Medal table
The medal count is as follows:

Schedule

See also
 Sports in China

References

External links

 Official website
 Shenzhen 2011 Universiade – Photos stadiums and schedule of events
 Universiade news and practical guide
 Stadium Seating Supplier
 Video Ceremony – Shenzhen 2011 Universiade 

 
Universiade Summer
U
Summer Universiade, 2011
Sport in Shenzhen
Multi-sport events in China
Summer World University Games
August 2011 sports events in China
Sports competitions in Guangdong